Baseline Road may refer to:
United States
Baseline Road (Arizona) in Phoenix
Baseline Road (Colorado) in Boulder
Baseline Road (Southern California)
M-102 (Michigan highway) in Southeast Michigan

Canada
Baseline Road (Ottawa) in Ontario
Baseline Road (Sherwood Park) in Alberta

See also
Baseline (surveying): "Baseline Road" in the United States